Tazeh Kand-e Angut (also Romanized as Tāzeh Kand-e Angūt; also known as Tāzeh Kand) is a city in the Central District of Ungut County, Ardabil province, Iran, and serves as capital of the county. Prior to the formation of the county, the city was in Angut District of Germi County for the three censuses listed here. At the 2006 census, its population was 1,556 in 364 households. The following census in 2011 counted 2,544 people in 598 households. The latest census in 2016 showed a population of 2,645 people in 717 households.

References 

Cities in Ardabil Province

Populated places in Ardabil Province